The Sanshan Islands (literally three hill islands;) are a group of three islands on Lake Tai in Wuxi, Jiangsu, China. It was a noted bandit haunt with temples and tall Buddha statues, the Lingshan Buddha on the Ma Shan peninsula being 289 feet (88 metres) high.

References

Islands of Jiangsu
National parks of China
Lake islands of China